In 1992, Have a Little Faith was the fourth Bill Frisell album released by Elektra Nonesuch, featuring performances by Frisell, clarinetist Don Byron, bassist Kermit Driscoll, accordion player Guy Klucevsek and drummer Joey Baron. The album covers a range of American classical and popular music.

Reception
The Penguin Guide to Jazz selected this album for its "Core Collection" calling it a "marvelous examination of Americana'".

An AllMusic review by Scott Yanow awarded the album 5 stars out of 5, stating, "This is one of the most inventive recordings of the 1990s and should delight most listeners from any genre".

Track listing
 "The Open Prairie": from Billy the Kid (Copland) – 3:11
 "Street Scene in a Frontier Town": from Billy the Kid (Copland) – 1:45
 "Mexican Dance and Finale": from Billy the Kid (Copland) – 3:44
 "Prairie Night (Card Game at Night)/Gun Battle": from Billy the Kid (Copland) – 5:02
 "Celebration After Billy's Capture": from Billy the Kid (Copland) – 2:17
 "Billy in Prison": from Billy the Kid (Copland) – 1:33
 "The Open Prairie Again": from Billy the Kid (Copland) – 2:34
 "The Saint-Gaudens in Boston Common": Excerpt 1 (Ives) – 0:41
 "Just Like a Woman" (Dylan) – 4:49
 "I Can't Be Satisfied" (Morganfield) (3:00)
 "Live to Tell" (Leonard, Madonna) – 10:10
 "The Saint-Gaudens in Boston Common": Excerpt 2 (Ives) –  3:05 
 "No Moe" (Rollins) – 2:37
 "Washington Post March" (Sousa) – 2:05
 "When I Fall in Love" (Heyman, Young) – 3:26
 "Little Jenny Dow" (Foster) – 3:30
 "Have a Little Faith in Me" (Hiatt) – 5:39
 "Billy Boy" (Traditional) – 1:38

Personnel
Bill Frisell – guitar
Don Byron – clarinet, bass clarinet
Guy Klucevsek – accordion
Kermit Driscoll – bass
Joey Baron – drums

References 

1992 albums
Bill Frisell albums
Nonesuch Records albums